"We Are One (Ole Ola)" is a song recorded by Cuban-American rapper Pitbull for One Love, One Rhythm – The 2014 FIFA World Cup Official Album (2014). It is the official song of the 2014 FIFA World Cup held in Brazil and features guest vocals from American singer Jennifer Lopez and Brazilian singer Claudia Leitte. The artists co-wrote the song with Sia, RedOne, Danny Mercer, Dr. Luke, Cirkut, and Thomas Troelsen; the latter three are also the producers.

While receiving positive reviews from critics, initially the song received some negative reactions from Brazilians over its lack of Brazilian feeling. To change that, another version was also released and the music changed slightly to fit Afro Brazilian group Olodum's style of drumming – that version being the one that was used in the music video for the song. "We Are One" has experienced commercial success, reaching the top 20 in countries including Austria, France, Germany, Italy, Spain, and World Cup's host country, Brazil. The song peaked at number one in three countries.

Background and release 
According to one of the co-writers of "We Are One (Ole Ola), Thomas Troelsen, he pitched a demo version "that had a sort of whistle thing in it" to Pitbull. On January 22, 2014, FIFA and Sony Music Entertainment announced that "We Are One (Ole Ola)" would serve as the official song of the 2014 FIFA World Cup. At the occasion, Pitbull said, "I'm honored to join Jennifer Lopez and Claudia Leitte at the FIFA World Cup to bring the world together. I truly believe that this great game and the power of music will help unify us because we are best when we are one." Lopez said Pitbull asked her to join the song: "I can't take credit for this. This was one of Pitbull's call-ins. He had this record, and he's like, 'I think this record could be great for the World Cup. He's like, 'Will you do it with me?' And I go, 'Yeah, of course.'" A solo version of the song featuring only Pitbull leaked online on February 2. On April 8, Pitbull tweeted an iTunes Store link to the track, debuting the song.

Critical response 
The song received generally lukewarm reviews. Carl Williott of Idolator opined that there is too much of Pitbull in the song, and not enough Lopez or Leitte. He, however, stated that the song is an upgrade from Shakira's "Waka Waka (This Time for Africa)", the official song of the 2010 FIFA World Cup. Fuse.tv wrote that, similarly to "Waka Waka", the song "blends the feel of the tournament's hosting country with an accessible, exciting pop sound that has instant repeat appeal". Judy Cantor-Navas of Billboard described the song as "surprisingly breezy", with Spin noting it to contain the "rah-rah international unity you'd expect for a Cup song". Luís Antônio Giron of Época criticized the album saying "maybe I'm wrong and Brazil only crave to be the same as what FIFA wants it to be. Brazil is fifalized". And praised music produced in Miami, "bomb on any track."

The song received some criticism from Brazilian and football fans over its tone and lyrics, particularly with the lyrics and video being labeled as a "big pile of clichés" and its failure to pay homage to Brazil's own rich musical heritage. Such criticism has pointed out the small amount of actual Portuguese lyrics involved, and critics stating their confusion to why "were Cuban-American rapper Pitbull and Bronx-born Puerto Rican singer Jennifer Lopez were chosen for the song, when there are so many other great musicians in the land of bossa nova", as well as its "reinforcement of stereotypes with smiling, barefoot children and semi-naked, samba-dancing women".

Music video
In February 2014, Pitbull, Leitte and Lopez shot the music video for "We Are One (Ole Ola)"  with Olodum in Fort Lauderdale, Florida, United States. Its concept was to simulate Carnival in its home country Brazil with the Olodum mix of the song being used as the soundtrack. It was released on May 16, 2014. As of October 2022, the video has received over 848 million views.

Live performances

Pitbull, Lopez and Leitte performed "We Are One (Ole Ola)" at the 2014 Billboard Music Awards on May 18, 2014. They also performed the song at the 2014 FIFA World Cup opening ceremony on June 12 in Arena Corinthians, São Paulo, prior to the Brazil v. Croatia match, preceded by Leitte's solo rendition of Ary Barroso's classic "Aquarela do Brasil". However, due to the amount of noise made by dancers and poor quality stadium acoustics, some spectators had difficulty hearing the vocals.

Track listing
German CD Single
 "We Are One (Ole Ola)" (featuring Jennifer Lopez and Claudia Leitte) – 3:42
 "We Are One (Ole Ola)" (featuring Jennifer Lopez and Claudia Leitte) (Olodum mix) – 3:56

Digital download
"We Are One (Ole Ola)" (featuring Jennifer Lopez and Claudia Leitte) – 3:42

Digital download – remix
"We Are One (Ole Ola)" (featuring Jennifer Lopez and Claudia Leitte) (Olodum mix) – 3:56

Digital download – opening ceremony version
"We Are One (Ole Ola)" (featuring Jennifer Lopez and Claudia Leitte) (Opening Ceremony Version) – 5:21

Credits and personnel 
Recording
Engineered at Al Burna's Extreme Mobile Recording Studio; eightysevenfourteen Studios, Los Angeles, California; Luke's in the Boo, Malibu, California; Miami Lights Studio, Miami, Florida; and Delta Lab Studios, Copenhagen, Denmark
Pitbull vocals recorded at Al Burna's Extreme Mobile Recording Studio, Santo Domingo, Dominican Republic
Mixed at MixStar Studios, Virginia Beach, Virginia
Mastered at Sterling Sound, New York City

Personnel

Armando C. Perez – songwriter, vocals
Thomas Troelsen – songwriter, producer, instruments, programming, additional background vocals, whistle
Jennifer Lopez – songwriter, vocals
Claudia Leitte – songwriter, vocals
Daniel Murcia – songwriter
Sia Furler – songwriter
Lukasz "Dr. Luke" Gottwald – songwriter, producer, instruments, programming, additional background vocals
Henry "Cirkut" Walter – songwriter, producer, instruments, programming, additional background vocals

Nadir Khayat – songwriter
Al Burna – engineer, Pitbull vocal recording
Rachael Findlen – engineer
Clint Gibbs – engineer
Cameron Montgomery – assistant engineer
Serban Ghenea – mixer
John Hanes – engineer for mix
Chris Gehringer – mastering

Charts

Weekly charts

Year-end charts

Certifications

Release history

References

External links 
Brazilian star Claudia Leitte to perform with Pitbull and Jennifer Lopez on the official song for the 2014 FIFA World Cup at FIFA.com
Official Music Video on YouTube
 Text and translation of the song

 

2014 songs
2014 singles
RCA Records singles
Pitbull (rapper) songs
Claudia Leitte songs
Jennifer Lopez songs
Macaronic songs
Song recordings produced by Dr. Luke
Songs written by Pitbull (rapper)
Songs written by Jennifer Lopez
Songs written by Sia (musician)
Songs written by Dr. Luke
Songs written by Thomas Troelsen
Songs written by Danny Mercer
Songs written by Cirkut (record producer)
Songs written by RedOne
Ultratop 50 Singles (Wallonia) number-one singles
2014 FIFA World Cup
FIFA World Cup official songs and anthems
Latin house songs